Otto Tausig (13 February 1922 – 10 October 2011) was an Austrian writer, director and actor. Although he usually appeared in German language films, he also played in English language films such as Love Comes Lately, and in French language films such as La Reine Margot and Place Vendôme.

Life and career
Tausig was the son of Jewish female author Franziska Tausig. When the Nazis annexed Austria in 1938, she managed to send 16-year-old Otto to England in answer to an advertisement for factory workers which had been posted in The Times. The two were eventually reunited in Vienna in 1948.

Tausig returned to Austria in 1946 and enrolled in the Max Reinhardt Seminar in Vienna. In 1948 he began as an actor, director and chief editor at the New Theatre in the Scala.

The New Theatre closed in 1956, after which Tausig worked at the Deutsches Theater and the Volksbühne in East Berlin, as a screenwriter and director of satirical short films of DEFA, the so-called "Das Stacheltier". In 1960 he moved to Zurich to work at the Schauspielhaus as a free-lance actor and director. A decade later, Tausig was an ensemble member and director at the Vienna Burgtheater, where he was active until 1983.

Tausig also worked as a freelance artist throughout the German-speaking world, and taught courses at the Max Reinhardt Seminar. He frequently wrote and directed German television films.  He was cremated at Feuerhalle Simmering, his ashes are buried in Vienna Central Cemetery.

Awards

 1995: Johann Nestroy Ring
 1997: Bruno Kreisky Award for Services to the Human Rights
 2005: European Peace Rose Waldhausen
 2007: Austrian Cross of Honour for Science and Art, 1st class
 2009: Nestroy Theatre Prize, Award for Lifetime Achievement

Filmography
Gasparone (1955)
Kurzer Prozess (1967) as Brenner
Bomber & Paganini (1976) as Simulant
 (1976) as Maurer
Den Tüchtigen gehört die Welt (1981) as Kramml – Gemüsehändler
 (1984)
Nocturne indien (1989) as Peter Schlemihl
Abraham's Gold (1990) as Pfarrer
 (1994) as Isaak Aufrichtig
La Reine Margot (1994) as Mendès
Die Schuld der Liebe (1997) as Auracher
Place Vendôme (1998) as Samy
Black Flamingos – Sie lieben euch zu Tode (1998)
Nobel (2001) as Gustav
Everyman's Feast (2002) as Jan Jedermann's father
Gebürtig (2002) as Alter Mann beim Casting
Epsteins Nacht (2002) as Karl Rose
SuperTex (2003) as Van Gelder
Poor Relatives (2005) as Samuel
Love Comes Lately (2007) as Max Kohn
Das Vaterspiel (2009) as Großvater
Berlin 36 (2009) as Leo Löwenstein

References

External links

1922 births
2011 deaths
Recipients of the Austrian Cross of Honour for Science and Art, 1st class
Austrian male film actors
Austrian Jews
Austrian male stage actors
Austrian male television actors
Male actors from Vienna
Place of death missing
20th-century Austrian male actors
21st-century Austrian male actors